Edward Ulmer Fulton (born January 27, 1955 in Abington, Pennsylvania) is a former American football offensive guard in the National Football League who played for the Los Angeles Rams and the Buffalo Bills. He finished his pro career in the Canadian Football League, playing three seasons for the Hamilton Tiger-Cats, where he was a two-time Eastern All Star. He played college football at the University of Maryland. He continues his love of football by coaching high school football in Carroll County, Maryland. He has worked with Westminster High School, North Carroll High School and Liberty High School.

References

1955 births
Living people
American football offensive guards
Maryland Terrapins football players
Los Angeles Rams players
Buffalo Bills players
Hamilton Tiger-Cats players
Players of American football from Pennsylvania